Reinhard Tritscher (5 August 1946 – 20 September 2018) was an Austrian alpine skier who competed in the 1972 Winter Olympics where he finished 8th in the Giant Slalom.

Death 
Tritscher's death on 20 September 2018 was a result of a climbing accident in Ramsau am Dachstein, Styria, at the age of 72.

References

External links
 sports-reference.com

1946 births
2018 deaths
Austrian male alpine skiers
Olympic alpine skiers of Austria
Alpine skiers at the 1972 Winter Olympics
People from Liezen District
Sportspeople from Styria